John Linden Merriman (27 June 1936 – 30 September 1999) was a British long-distance runner. He competed in the men's 10,000 metres at the 1960 Summer Olympics.

References

1936 births
1999 deaths
Athletes (track and field) at the 1960 Summer Olympics
British male long-distance runners
Olympic athletes of Great Britain
Place of birth missing
Commonwealth Games medallists in athletics
Commonwealth Games silver medallists for Wales
Commonwealth Games bronze medallists for Wales
Athletes (track and field) at the 1958 British Empire and Commonwealth Games
Athletes (track and field) at the 1962 British Empire and Commonwealth Games
Medallists at the 1958 British Empire and Commonwealth Games
Medallists at the 1962 British Empire and Commonwealth Games